Paige Railey (born May 15, 1987 in Clearwater, Florida) is an American sailor who races in the Laser Radial division. She has been a member of U.S. Sailing Team since 2005 and is also a member of the Harken and McLube Speedteam. She was awarded in 2006 the ISAF World Sailor of the Year Award and the U.S. Sailing's Rolex Yachtswoman of the Year.

She nearly qualified for the 2008 Beijing Olympics but was edged out by eventual gold-medal winner Anna Tunnicliffe at the U.S. Olympic Trials. Paige competed in the 2012 Olympic Games in London, the 2016 Olympic Games in Rio de Janeiro, and the 2020 Olympic Games in Tokyo.

Life 
Railey was raised in Clearwater, Florida and is an alumna of the University of South Florida in Tampa. Her older brother Zack Railey is an American sailor and silver medalist.

References

External links
 
 

1987 births
Living people
American female sailors (sport)
Olympic sailors of the United States
Sailors at the 2012 Summer Olympics – Laser Radial
Pan American Games gold medalists for the United States
Pan American Games silver medalists for the United States
Sailors at the 2007 Pan American Games
Sailors at the 2011 Pan American Games
Sailors at the 2015 Pan American Games
US Sailor of the Year
ISAF World Sailor of the Year (female)
Sailors at the 2016 Summer Olympics – Laser Radial
Pan American Games medalists in sailing
University of South Florida olympians
University of South Florida alumni
Medalists at the 2007 Pan American Games
Medalists at the 2011 Pan American Games
Medalists at the 2015 Pan American Games
Sailors at the 2020 Summer Olympics – Laser Radial
World champions in sailing for the United States
Laser Radial class world champions
21st-century American women